

Films

References

Films
LGBT
2002
2002-related lists